Paul Falk (21 December 1921 – 20 May 2017) was a German pair skater. Born in Dortmund, Germany, he skated with Ria Baran and became two-time World champion and 1952 Olympic champion. Baran and Falk married during their active international figure skating.

The pair skated for the club Düsseldorfer EG and had no coach. Until 1951 Baran and Falk were not able to participate in international competitions because Germany was excluded from international sport after World War II. They were the first couple who performed side by side double jumps and they also invented the Lasso-Lift. Baran and Falk were never defeated in amateur competition.

In 1951 Falk was voted the male athlete of the year in Germany. After winning the Olympics in 1952 they turned professional and worked for Holiday on Ice. Falk's profession outside athletics was as a precision mechanic. In 1993 pair were inducted into the World Figure Skating Hall of Fame. He died  months before Aliona Savchenko and Bruno Massot won the gold medal for pairs skating at the 2018 Winter Olympics.

Results
(pairs with Ria Baran)

References

1921 births
2017 deaths
German male pair skaters
Figure skaters at the 1952 Winter Olympics
Olympic figure skaters of Germany
Olympic gold medalists for Germany
Olympic medalists in figure skating
World Figure Skating Championships medalists
European Figure Skating Championships medalists
Medalists at the 1952 Winter Olympics
Sportspeople from Dortmund
21st-century German people
20th-century German people